The Zen of CSS Design: Visual Enlightenment for the Web is a book by web designers Dave Shea and Molly E. Holzschlag, published in 2005.  The book is based on 36 designs featured at the CSS Zen Garden resource, an online showcase of CSS-based design. The process that each designer took in coming up with the final design is examined in each case study.

It was reviewed favorably by freelance Web designer Karen Morrill-McClure of Digital Web Magazine:

See also 

 CSS
 Zen
 CSS Zen Garden
 Web design

References

External links 
 CSS Zen Garden
 Mezzoblue (Creator Dave Shea's weblog on web design issues)
 Technique Web Design
 Creative Agency: Web Design

Cascading Style Sheets